Borji Kheyl-e Langur (also Romanized as Borjī Kheyl-e Langūr) is a village in Feyziyeh Rural District, in the Central District of Babol County, Mazandaran Province, Iran. At the 2006 census, its population was 72, in 20 families.

References 

Populated places in Babol County